Bei (Chinese:邶國 pinyin: Bei Guo) was a vassal state of Zhou in the early Zhou dynasty was in the southeast of Tangyin country (Today: Henan Province).

References 

Ancient Chinese states
1st-millennium BC disestablishments in China
Zhou dynasty